German Lake is a lake in Le Sueur County, in the U.S. state of Minnesota. A majority of the early settlers near the lake being natives of Germany caused the name to be selected. The lake is fed from Lake Jefferson through a connecting culvert, and is part of the Cannon River watershed.

See also
List of lakes in Minnesota

References

Lakes of Minnesota
Lakes of Le Sueur County, Minnesota